The original Charlotte Hornets of the  National Basketball Association (NBA) were established in 1988 as an expansion team, based in Charlotte, North Carolina. The team's roster was filled with unprotected players at the 1988 NBA Expansion Draft, and five days later the Hornets made their first picks out of college players at the 1988 NBA draft. The Hornets remained in Charlotte for 14 seasons before relocating to New Orleans in 2002. Two years after the Hornets' departure, the Charlotte Bobcats were established in 2004. The Bobcats first participated in the 2004 NBA draft, two days after their expansion draft was held. The franchise's name was changed back to the Hornets at the conclusion of the 2013–14 season, one year after the team in Louisiana renamed itself the New Orleans Pelicans. The history and records of the original Charlotte Hornets were conveyed to the newly named Charlotte Hornets.

In 1989, the NBA agreed with the National Basketball Players Association to reduce drafts to two rounds, an arrangement that has remained the same up the present time. Before each draft, an NBA Draft Lottery determines the first round selection order for the teams that missed the playoffs during the prior season. Teams can also trade their picks, which means that in some drafts, teams may have more or less than two draft picks, although they must have at least one first-round pick every other year.

The first pick in the Hornets' history was Rex Chapman, a shooting guard from the University of Kentucky. The Hornets had three top-four picks and all of them have participated in the NBA All-Star Game: Larry Johnson, Alonzo Mourning, and Baron Davis. In 1996, the Hornets drafted Kobe Bryant 13th overall, but traded him for Vlade Divac. Bryant finished his career as an MVP, a four-time All-star game MVP, a two-time Finals MVP, an eleven-time all-NBA first team, and a five-time NBA Champion. The first player picked by the Bobcats, Emeka Okafor, was named the 2004–05 Rookie of the Year and voted to the NBA All-Rookie First Team.

Key

Selections

Notes

References
General

Specific

 
National Basketball Association draft
draft history